L. Ross Babcock III is a game designer who has worked primarily on role-playing games.

Career
When Jordan Weisman asked his friends in 1980 if anyone else would join him in starting a company to print adventures and deckplans for Traveller, and L. Ross Babcock III had the money and together they formed FASA. Weisman and Babcock printed up a few hundred copies of Weisman's early adventures, and sold them to a local Chicago store; shortly they began sending samples to distributors who were soon selling them to retailers nationwide. Babcock and Weisman knew of William H. Keith Jr. and Andrew Keith as freelancers who regularly wrote and drew for Game Designers' Workshop, and their knowledge of GDW encouraged them to bring the Keith brothers into the company as their first recruits in 1980. In August 1981, FASA came to an agreement to publish the magazine High Passage, for which Weisman and Babcock did layout and editing. Babcock helped design the role-playing game Behind Enemy Lines (1982). After obtaining the license to create a Star Trek role-playing game, Weisman and Babcock looked out-of-house for a Star Trek design team, and Fantasimulations Association ultimately created Star Trek: The Role Playing Game (1983) for FASA.

When FASA Interactive became Microsoft's FASA Studio, both Babcock and Weisman went over to Microsoft. In early 2000, Babcock stepped up as the final president of FASA, overseeing the company as it was ready to get out of the tabletop publishing business. On January 25, 2001, Mort Weisman (father of Jordan) and Ross Babcock announced that FASA was closing down in an orderly way after producing a few final products.

References

External links
 

Living people
Role-playing game designers
Year of birth missing (living people)